Pasco High School may refer to:

 Pasco High School (Washington), United States
 Pasco High School (Florida), United States